Bivetiella cancellata is a species of sea snail, a marine gastropod mollusk in the family Cancellariidae, the nutmeg snails.

Description
The shell size varies between 20 mm and 50 mm.

Distribution

This species occurs in European waters, the Mediterranean Sea and in the Atlantic Ocean off the Canary Islands, Cape Verde, West Africa and Angola.

References

 Verhecken A. (2007). Revision of the Cancellariidae (Mollusca, Neogastropoda, Cancellarioidea) of the eastern Atlantic (40°N-40°S) and the Mediterranean. Zoosystema : 29(2): 281–364

External links
 

Cancellariidae
Gastropods described in 1767
Taxa named by Carl Linnaeus
Molluscs of the Atlantic Ocean
Molluscs of the Mediterranean Sea
Molluscs of the Canary Islands
Molluscs of Angola
Gastropods of Cape Verde